What to Expect When No One's Expecting: America's Coming Demographic Disaster is a book by the Weekly Standard columnist Jonathan V. Last about declining birthrates in the United States and elsewhere around the world and the implications for demographics and the functioning of society and the economy (hardcover release February 2013, paperback release June 2014).

Reception

Media appearances, interviews, and self-promotion
Last wrote an article in the Wall Street Journal summarizing the key themes of his book.

Last was interviewed by Kathryn Jean Lopez for National Review. He also appeared to discuss the book on John Stossel's show on the Fox Business Network and on MSNBC's program The Cycle.

Detailed reviews
Nick Gillespie, editor of Reason Magazine, reviewed the book on Bookforum, saying that he was convinced by Last's argument that birthrates were declining and there was not much that could be done about it, but found Last's account of the negative consequences exaggerated.

David Desrosiers reviewed the book favorably for Washington Times, writing that Last has argued that declining birthrates are largely a consequence of the changes set in motion by the Enlightenment rather than of any specific government policies, though policies by US liberals may have sped up the decline. Stanley Kurtz and Bradford Wilcox wrote separate reviews of the book for National Review.

William McGurn, editor of the New York Post, reviewed the book favorably for the Wall Street Journal, but was critical of Last for having too much confidence in his pessimistic scenarios. McGurn concluded: "In theory, it's all certainly possible. But as Mr. Last reminds us, we do well to be modest about our predictions. Because the one thing the math tells us is this: We've never been here before."

Walter Russell Mead reviewed the book for Foreign Affairs.

Joel E. Cohen reviewed the book for The New York Review of Books.

Mentions
Elizabeth Kolbert discussed the book along with many others in an article for The New Yorker about population. Last wrote a response to Kolbert's review, and Daniel Halper concurred with Last's assessment of the review, claiming that Kolbert "gets it completely wrong."

A New York Times article in April 2013 listed Last's book as one of many that was raising a "false alarm" about declining US fertility.

See also
 The Empty Cradle by Phillip Longman

References

2013 non-fiction books
Natalism
Encounter Books books